Higashi-Ikoma Station (東生駒駅) is a railway station on Kintetsu Railway's Nara Line in Ikoma, Nara Prefecture, Japan.

Building
The station has an island platform serving 2 tracks between 2 passing tracks.

1st floor
Bus Terminal (Nara Kotsu)
Harves
Resona Bank

2nd floor
Ticket machines and windows (Commuter tickets and limited express tickets available)
Station office
Taxi stand
Harves
McDonald's
Automated teller machine of the Bank of Kyoto, Ltd.
Automated teller machine of Sumitomo Mitsui Banking Corporation

3rd floor

A returning track is located in the east of the station. Before the diagram revision in 2006, local trains used the track and returned for Namba during the non-rush hours, and the track is used in the morning and the evening for the local trains returning for Osaka Namba and Amagasaki.

Surroundings
North side
Kintetsu Higashi-Ikoma Depot (Keihanna Line), Higashi-Hanazono Inspection Area
Ikoma City Library
South side
Bus Terminal (Nara Kotsu)
Kintetsu Cable Network
NARA IKOMA Rapid Railway Company, Limited
Mister Donut
FamilyMart
Miyawaki Shoten
Nanto Bank
 
East side
Tezukayama University Higashi-Ikoma Campus (Nara)
Higashi-Ikoma Post Office
West side
Ikoma Municipal Ikoma Elementary School
Ikoma Fire Department

Bus Terminal
Bus stop 1 (for Tezukayama Jutaku)
Route 74 for Tezukayama Jutaku via Tezukayama University
Route 75 for Tezukayama Jutaku
Route 64 for Tezukayama Jutaku via Satsukidai Jutaku
Route 文 for Tezukayama University
Bus stop 2 (for Satsukidai and Oze)
Routes 62 and 63 for Satsukidai and Oze
Route 76 for Satsukidai
Bus stop 3 (for Ikoma Station, for Shiraniwadai, Asukano and Hikarigaoka via Route 167)
Routes 63, 64, 165, 168, and 文 for 
Route 64 for Asukano Center
Route 165 for Shiraniwadai Station via Asukano Center
Route 168 and 172 for Hikarigaoka via Asukano Center and Shiraniwadai Station

References

Adjacent stations

Railway stations in Japan opened in 1968
Railway stations in Nara Prefecture